Obst is a German language surname, which means "fruit". It may refer to:

Alan Obst (born 1987), Australian football player
Andreas Obst (born 1996), German basketball player
Andrew Obst (born 1964), Australian football player
Chris Obst (born 1979), Australian football player
David Obst (born 1946), American literary agent
Erich Obst (1886–1981), German geographer
Henry Obst (1906–1975), American football player
Herbert Obst (born 1936), Canadian fencer
Lynda Obst (born 1950), American film producer
Michael Obst (born 1944), German rower
Michael Obst (composer) (born 1955), German composer
Peter Obst (born 1936), Australian football player
Sam Obst (born 1980), Australian rugby league player
Seweryn Obst (1847- 1917), Polish painter, illustrator and ethnographer
Trevor Obst (1940–2015), Australian football player

German-language surnames
Jewish surnames